Dzaïr TV was an Arabic-language satellite television channel broadcasting from Hydra. Dzaïr TV was set up by an Algerian businessman Ali Haddad was a number of Arab intellectuals from Algeria and the Arab World. The channel ceased operations on June 25, 2019.

History
Dzaïr TV was founded on 8 May 2013, it has started to broadcast its programs on 8 May 2013.
The channel ceased operations on June 25, 2019.

Events
Notable events to which Dzair TV and its sister channels hold broadcasting rights include:

 Algerian Ligue Professionnelle 2
 Algerian Handball Championship
 Algerian Basketball Championship
 Algerian Basketball Cup

Programs

Current affairs

Series 
 The Big Bang Theory

Cartoons 
 Tom and Jerry
 Teen Titans

On-air staff 
 Meryem Adjal

References

External links
 

Arab mass media
Television in Algeria
Arabic-language television stations
Arabic-language television
Television channels and stations established in 2013
Television channels and stations disestablished in 2019
Television stations in Algeria
2001 establishments in Algeria
2019 disestablishments in Algeria